Weldenia is a monotypic genus of flowering plants in the family Commelinaceae, first formally described in 1829. It has one single species: Weldenia candida, which grows natively in Mexico and Guatemala.

This herbaceous perennial has broad green, strap-shaped leaves growing in a rosette. The central, three-petalled, bright white flowers are borne over a long period in late spring and summer. It requires dry conditions over winter, so is best grown in an alpine house or similar, where protection can be provided.

The Latin specific epithet candida means "shining white".

References

Commelinaceae
Monotypic Commelinales genera
Flora of Mexico
Flora of Guatemala
Flora of the Central American montane forests